Playboy's 40th Anniversary: Four Decades of Jazz 1953–1993 is a 1993 box set, which was released to commemorate the 40th anniversary of Playboy magazine and its long association with jazz music. The four-disc set contains 51 songs total, selected by Playboy founder Hugh M. Hefner himself and a 48-page booklet written by jazz musician and historian Leonard Feather and music critic and journalist Neil Tesser. Each disc represents an entire decades' worth of music: disc one showcases songs released between 1953 and 1963, disc two contains songs from between 1963 and 1973, disc three consists of songs released from 1973 to 1983 and disc four consists of songs released between 1983 and 1993. The box set showcases various styles of jazz, from vocal jazz, bebop and swing, to more commercial, pop-oriented styles such as smooth jazz, electro-jazz and jazz fusion.

Tracklist

Disc One (1953–1963) 
 "Now's the Time" by Charlie Parker 3:01
 "Every Day I Have the Blues" by Count Basie and Joe Williams 5:24
 "Lullaby of Birdland" by Sarah Vaughan and Clifford Brown 3:58
 "A Night in Tunisia" by Dizzy Gillespie 4:14
 "Lady Sings the Blues" by Billie Holiday 3:44
 "Misty" by Erroll Garner 2:45
 "Take the "A" Train" by Ella Fitzgerald and Duke Ellington 6:36
 "What a Diff'rence a Day Made" by Dinah Washington 2:28
 "Django" by the Modern Jazz Quartet 7:03
 "I Apologize" by Billy Eckstine 3:00
 "Blue Monk" by Thelonious Monk 7:34
 "Too Close for Comfort" by Mel Tormé 3:59
 "Goodbye Pork Pie Hat" by Charles Mingus 4:46
 "Take Five" by the Dave Brubeck Quartet 5:25
 "'Round Midnight" by Miles Davis 5:13
 "Giant Steps" by John Coltrane 4:43

Disc Two (1963–1973) 
 "Night Train" by Oscar Peterson 4:50
 "I Loves You, Porgy" by Nina Simone 2:31
 "Maiden Voyage" by Herbie Hancock 7:55
 "Mercy, Mercy, Mercy" by Cannonball Adderley 5:08
 "The Girl from Ipanema" by Stan Getz and Astrud Gilberto 5:21
 "Song for My Father" by Horace Silver 7:16
 "Sidewinder" by Lee Morgan 10:20
 "A Day in the Life" by Wes Montgomery 5:30
 "Walk on the Wild Side" by Jimmy Smith 5:50
 "Compared to What" by Les McCann and Eddie Harris 8:41
 "Soul Sauce" by Cal Tjader 2:22
 "Memphis Underground" by Herbie Mann 7:07
 "Captain Marvel" by Return to Forever 4:53

Disc Three (1973–1983) 
 "Also Sprach Zarathustra (2001)" by Eumir Deodato 8:58
 "Pieces of Dreams" by Stanley Turrentine 4:32
 "Crystal Silence" by Gary Burton and Chick Corea 9:01
 "Birds of Fire" by the Mahavishnu Orchestra 5:41
 "My Song" by Keith Jarrett 6:09
 "Body Heat" by Quincy Jones 4:18
 "Black Byrd" by Donald Byrd 8:00
 "Feels So Good" by Chuck Mangione 9:41
 "Everybody Loves the Sunshine" by Roy Ayers 4:01
 "Mister Magic" by Grover Washington Jr. 9:11

Disc Four (1983–1993) 
 "Phase Dance" by Pat Metheny 8:17
 "For the Love of You" by Earl Klugh 5:59
 "Here's to Life" by Shirley Horn 5:36
 "Lush Life" by Joe Henderson 4:57
 "Restoration" by Bob James 5:44
 "Look What I Got!" by Betty Carter 5:41
 "The Lady in My Life" by Stanley Jordan 6:26
 "Bird Alone" by Abbey Lincoln and Stan Getz 8:33
 "Songbird" by Kenny G 5:00
 "Max-O-Man" by Fourplay 5:32
 "Don't Worry, Be Happy" by Bobby McFerrin 4:48
 "Rockit" by Herbie Hancock 5:24

References 

Playboy
1993 compilation albums
Jazz compilation albums